Karanja Sohol Wildlife Sanctuary is a protected area in the Karanja talukas of Washim district in Maharashtra, India. It was created in 2000 to preserve the black buck population.

Description
There are a few undulating hills in the sanctuary with a large area which is a part of the catchment area of Aadan reservoir. The sanctuary is best approached by road from Washim. The nearest rail head is Murtizapur.

History
The management plan for Karanja Sohol wildlife sanctuary is approved vide letter Desk-22(8)/521(3)/172 dt. 29/04/2009  for the year 2009/2010 to 2018/2019 by the Government of India.

Biodiversity

Flora
Karanja Sohol Wildlife Sanctuary is an undulating tract of grasslands interspersed with wooded areas.
The tropical and subtropical dry broadleaf forests harbours teak (Tectona grandis) and Coromandel ebony (Diospyros melanoxylon) as predominant species. Other important tree species include ain (Terminalia alata), axlewood (Anogeissus latifolia), lendia (Lagerstroemia parviflora), shiwan (Gmelina aoborea), kalamb (Mitragyna paoviflora), telia, Indian rosewood (Dalbergia latifolia) and bija (Pterocarpus marsupium).

Fauna
The sanctuary attracts a large variety of migratory waterfowl from November to March every year. 17 mammal species, 75 bird species, 18 reptiles, three amphibians, 23 fishes and 48 butterfly and spider species were recorded. Mammal species include Indian muntjac (Muntiacus muntjak), striped hyena (Hyaena hyaena), sambar deer (Rusa unicolor), jungle cat (Felis chaus), wild boar (Sus scrofa). 

Grass has been grown to aid restoring blackbuck (Antilope cervicapra). and spotted deer (Axis axis).

Notes

Wildlife sanctuaries in Maharashtra
Tourist attractions in Raigad district
Nature conservation in India
Wildlife conservation in India
2000 establishments in Maharashtra
Protected areas established in 2000